In Greek mythology, Scamandrodice (Ancient Greek: Σκαμανδροδίκη) was the mother of King Cycnus of Colonae by the sea-god Poseidon. She abandoned her son on the seashore but he was rescued by fishermen who named him Cycnus "swan" because they saw a swan flying over him. In some accounts, the mother of Cycnus was given as Harpale or Calyce, daughter of Hecaton or lastly, an unknown Nereid.

Notes

References 

 Gaius Julius Hyginus, Fabulae from The Myths of Hyginus translated and edited by Mary Grant. University of Kansas Publications in Humanistic Studies. Online version at the Topos Text Project.

Women of Poseidon
Women in Greek mythology